Jack Levin (born John Douglas Le Vien; 17 July 1914 – 9 November 1999) was an American television producer, active in British and American television.

Early life
Le Vien was born in New York City in 1914. In 1930, he was employed by Pathé News as an office boy. He eventually was promoted to film editing and then to reporting.<ref name="Jack"

Career
Le Vien joined the U.S. Army in 1941 and was commissioned as a public relations officer. Promoted to lieutenant colonel he became a senior press aide to General General Eisenhower, taking part in the North African, Sicilian, Italian and Normandy landings. After the war, he returned to Pathe as news editor, then editor-in-chief and vice-president. After Pathe closed their office, Le Vien established his own film and TV production company. In 1961, he was the executive producer of The Valiant Years a documentary made by ABC television with the cooperation of the BBC. Subsequently, Le Vien turned the documentary into a book, Winston Churchill: The Valiant Years, published in 1962. The following year, he was the executive producer of the Black Fox: The Rise and Fall of Adolf Hitler, which won a 1963 Academy Award for Best Documentary Feature.

During his career, Le Vien and his wife, Josephine, became friends of the Churchills and the Duke and Duchess of Windsor and in 1965 he made A King's Story, a film about the Windsors. Partnering with the BBC, Le Vien he went on to produce dramatized versions Churchill's life to include Walk With Destiny, starring Richard Burton and Churchill and the Generals with Timothy West starring as Churchill. Le Vien also wrote books to accompany these projects.

In 1962 Le Vien appeared as himself on the game show To Tell the Truth. He was introduced as a television producer, colonel in the Army Reserves  and a biographer of Winston Churchill. After his identity was revealed, host Bud Collyer mentioned that Le Vien was working on a documentary of the Windsors.

Death
Le Vien died in 1999 at his residence in London. At the time of his death, he was survived by his wife, Josephine.

Selected filmography
The Valiant Years, 1961
The Finest Hours, 1964
A King's Story, 1965
 The Other World of Winston Churchill, 1966
The Gathering Storm, 1974
 The Amazing Voyage of Daffodil and Daisy, 1975
 Where the Lotus Fell, 1976
 The Story of Cicero, The Queen's Drum Horse, 1977
Churchill and the Generals, 1979
 The Glittering Crowns, 1981
A Question of Choice, 1983
Whicker!, 1984

Books
 Winston Churchill: The Valiant Years

References

External links

Businesspeople from New York City
Television producers from New York City
1914 births
1999 deaths
20th-century American businesspeople